Dissent (rendered on the masthead as D!SSENT) was an Australian national magazine devoted to the analysis of politics, economics and issues in Australian society in general. It was published three times a year in Melbourne, Australia. The Co-editors were Kenneth Davidson  and Lesley Vick. Kenneth Davidson also has a monthly column with the Melbourne newspaper The Age.

The magazine has no formal ties with any political party or group but as stated on its website the content  reflects the Editors' views which dissent from the prevailing orthodoxy that the welfare state should be cut back in favour of economic efficiency and unfettered individual liberty.

An earlier journal with the same title was published in Melbourne, Australia, from 1961 until 1978.  It was subtitled, "A radical quarterly".  The later issues were published in co-operation with the Students' Representative Council of the University of Melbourne.

In April 2014 it was announced that Number 44, Autumn/Winter 2014 would be the final edition of D!ssent.

Contributors
Contributors have included Andrew Wilkie, Beatrice Faust, Marilyn Lake, Brian Walters, John Quiggin, David Hill, Barry Jones, Kerry Nettle, Mark Diesendorf, Don Aitkin, Evan Whitton, Mick Dodson, James Jupp, John Langmore, and Graham Palmer.

References

External links
Dissent.com.au – official website

2000 establishments in Australia
2014 disestablishments in Australia
Defunct political magazines published in Australia
Magazines established in 2000
Magazines disestablished in 2014
Magazines published in Melbourne
News magazines published in Australia
Triannual magazines